The 1999–2000 Iraq FA Cup was the 23rd edition of the Iraq FA Cup as a clubs-only competition. The tournament was won by Al-Zawraa for the third time in a row and the 14th time in their history, beating Al-Quwa Al-Jawiya 4–3 on penalties in the final after a 0–0 draw. Al-Zawraa also won the League, the Elite Cup and the Super Cup in the 1999–2000 season to become the second Iraqi side to win the domestic quadruple.

Preliminary round

Preliminary playoff round

Final phase

Bracket

Round of 32 

Al-Karkh won 4–3 on aggregate.

Samarra won 3–2 on aggregate.

Salahaddin won 9–1 on aggregate.

Al-Difaa Al-Jawi won 5–3 on aggregate.

Al-Shabab won 1–0 on aggregate.

3–3 on aggregate. Al-Jaish won on away goals.

Al-Bahri won 6–2 on aggregate.

Al-Quwa Al-Jawiya won 7–1 on aggregate.

1–1 on aggregate. Haifa won on away goals.

Al-Minaa won 2–0 on aggregate.

Erbil won 4–0 on aggregate.

Al-Najaf won 2–1 on aggregate.

Balad won 3–2 on aggregate.

Diyala won 7–3 on aggregate.

1–1 on aggregate. Al-Ramadi won 4–2 on penalties.

Al-Zawraa won 4–0 on aggregate.

Round of 16

Al-Karkh won 6–1 on aggregate.

Al-Difaa Al-Jawi won 2–1 on aggregate.

Al-Jaish won 2–1 on aggregate.

Al-Quwa Al-Jawiya won 4–1 on aggregate.

Al-Minaa won 2–1 on aggregate.

Erbil won 2–1 on aggregate.

Diyala won 5–0 on aggregate.

Al-Zawraa won 12–0 on aggregate.

Quarter-finals

Al-Karkh won 4–0 on aggregate.

Al-Quwa Al-Jawiya won 5–4 on aggregate.

Al-Minaa won 2–1 on aggregate.

Al-Zawraa won 5–0 on aggregate.

Semi-finals

Al-Quwa Al-Jawiya won 2–0 on aggregate.

Al-Zawraa won 3–0 on aggregate.

Final

References

External links
 Iraqi Football Website

Iraq FA Cup
Cup